A champagne glass is stemware designed for champagne and other sparkling wines. The two most common forms are the flute and coupe, both stemmed; holding the glass by the stem prevents warming the drink. Champagne can also be drunk from a normal wine glass, which allows better appreciation of the flavor, at the expense of accentuating the bubbles less.

Flute 

The champagne flute was developed along with other wine stemware in the early 18th century as the preferred shape for sparkling wine as materials for drinking vessels shifted from metal and ceramic to glassware. Initially, the flute was tall, conical, and slender; by the 20th century, preferences changed from a straight-sided glass to one which curved inward slightly near the lip.

This inward taper is designed to retain champagne's signature carbonation by reducing the surface area for it to escape. Nucleation in a champagne glass helps form the wine's bubbles; too much surface area allows carbonation to fizzle out quickly. More bubbles create greater texture in the taster's mouth, and a flute's deep bowl allows for greater visual effect of bubbles rising to the top. The flute's narrow cross-section also minimizes the oxygen-to-wine ratio, which enhances both the wine's aroma and taste.

While most commonly used for sparkling wines, flutes are also used for certain beers, especially fruit beers and Belgian lambics and gueuzes. The flute shows off the beer's color, and helps gather the aroma for the nose. The champagne flute is distinguished from the pilsner glass, which lacks a stem.

Coupe 
The champagne coupe is a shallow, broad-bowled saucer shaped stemmed glass generally capable of containing  of liquid. The coupe was fashionable in France from its introduction in the 18th century until the 1970s, and in the United States from the 1930s to the 1980s. Coupes are also often used for cocktails served up in lieu of a cocktail glass on account of the latter glass's greater propensity to spilling.

Tulip
Champagne is also served in a tulip glass. The white wine tulip is distinguishable from the champagne flute by its wider, flared body and mouth. Some oenophiles (wine lovers) prefer the tulip glass, as it permits the drinker to get more of the aroma than a traditional flute while the mouth is still narrow enough to avoid quick loss of carbonation. The Washington Post food columnist Dave McIntyre has argued that the tulip allows the champagne to move to the middle from the front of the tongue, allowing the wine's flavor to be better expressed. The glassmaker Riedel particularly criticizes flutes as one-dimensional, impairing drinkers' ability to appreciate a wine's full range of aromas and taste profiles.

Double-wall stemware
In the 1960s, double-wall stemware was developed to slow the transfer of heat from a drinker's hand to champagne and other beverages. Inner and outer walls are separated by a small gap filled with air, a poor thermal conductor.

References
Notes

Citations

Bibliography

External links
How to Serve Champagne, IntoWine

Drinking glasses
Champagne (wine)
Drinkware
Wine accessories
Beer glassware